Reginald Nettleship (23 February 1925 – 2001) was an English professional footballer who played in the Football League for Mansfield Town.

References

1925 births
2001 deaths
English footballers
Association football forwards
English Football League players
Sheffield United F.C. players
Mansfield Town F.C. players